Avijaja "Avi" Lund Järund (born 6 December 1966 in Qaqortoq, Kujalleq, Greenland, Denmark as Avijaja Petri) is a Danish female curler and curling coach. Also known as Avijaja "Avi" Lund, Avijaja Lund Nielsen, Avijaja Nielsen.

She is a participant of the 2002 Winter Olympics.

Teams

Record as a coach of national teams

References

External links
 
 
 

Living people
1966 births
People from Qaqortoq
Greenlandic sportswomen
Danish female curlers
Olympic curlers of Denmark
Curlers at the 2002 Winter Olympics
Danish curling champions
Danish curling coaches